Bitsevski Park, or Bitsa Park, is one of the largest natural parks (forests) in Moscow, Russia. The park is elongated from north to south and is bounded by Balaklavsky Avenue from the north.

Nature

The park is home to more than 500 species of plants, including lindens, oaks, and fine firs, planted by Mikhail Katkov's son at his family manor in the 19th century. 33 species of mammals and 78 species of birds have been registered in the park.

Relative events
The grounds of the park contain the Museum of Paleontology, as well as the 18th-century country estates of Uzkoye and Znamenskoye-Sadki and the reconstructed estate of Yasenevo. They skirt the Bitsa horse-riding complex which was built for the 1980 Olympic Games. The forest was the site where serial killer Alexander Pichushkin committed the vast majority of his 61 murders.

References

External links 

 The official site of the Bitsevski Park 

Parks and gardens in Moscow
Forests of Russia
Forest parks in Russia